The UCLA Collection of Meteorites is one of the largest meteorite collections in the United States.  The collection of meteorites began in 1934 when William Andrews Clark, Jr. donated a  fragment of the Canyon Diablo meteorite, now known as the Clark Iron.   Over time, the collection grew to include over 2400 samples from about 1500 different meteorites.  They have forty mostly complete meteorites.   A museum exhibiting 100 specimens from the larger collection opened to the public in 2013, with a grand opening in January 2014.

References

External links
 UCLA meteorite collection web site
 Campus map

Museums in Los Angeles
Natural history museums in California
Meteorite Collection
University museums in California
Geology museums in California
Science and technology in Greater Los Angeles